Kuybyshevo is a rural locality (a selo) in Kalinovsky Selsoviet, Tarumovsky District, Republic of Dagestan, Russia. The population was 36 as of 2010.

Geography 
Kuybyshevo is located 24 km southwest of Tarumovka (the district's administrative centre) by road. Tarumovka is the nearest rural locality.

References 

Rural localities in Tarumovsky District